Bolshoy is a rural locality (a khutor) in Mikhaylovka Urban Okrug, Volgograd Oblast, Russia. The population was 1,630 as of 2010. There are 27 streets.

Geography 
Bolshoy is located 26 km northeast of Mikhaylovka. Mokhovsky is the nearest rural locality.

References 

Rural localities in Mikhaylovka urban okrug